Niinimaa is a small village in Alavus city, Southern Ostrobothnia, Finland.

External links
 Niinimaa on Google Maps
 Niinimaa Family

Villages in Finland